Pontioi Katerini F.C. was a local football club founded in 1977, which was based on Katerini, Greece. In 2010, they had won promotion from the Delta Ethniki as champions of Group 3, and since then they competed in the Football League 2.
They had won twice the regional championship of the football federation of Pieria, gaining a place in Delta Ethniki; once in 1993–94 and again in 2008–09. The club had also won the regional federation cup thrice in 1985–86, 2008–09 and 2009–10.

Merger with Iraklis Thessaloniki

In June 2011, Iraklis F.C. was demoted from Superleague to amateur divisions, due to financial problems. While competing in Delta Ethniki, Iraklis' board reached an agreement with Pontioi Katerinis for a merger between the two clubs. Pontioi Katerinis changed their name to AEP Iraklis, took the badge and colors of Iraklis and moved to Kaftanzoglio Stadium. The new squad consisted of players from both teams and initially trained in Katerini. Virtually, Iraklis replaced Pontioi Katerinis, who ceased to exist. On 20 January 2012, the merger was approved by amateur Iraklis, and their football team withdrew from the Delta Ethniki. Ιn August 2012, AEP Iraklis was incorporated as AEP Iraklis 1908 FC.

References

Association football clubs established in 1977
Football clubs in Central Macedonia
Defunct football clubs in Greece
1977 establishments in Greece